Aung Chan Mya (born 1994) is a Burmese model and male pageant winner who won the Mister International Myanmar 2014 and represented Myanmar at the Mister International 2014 in Seoul on 14 February 2015.

Pageantry

Mister International Myanmar 2014
He competed in the Mister Myanmar 2014 which was held on 8 November 2014 in Taw Win Garden Hotel, Yangon  Myanmar. He became the winner of the Mister International Myanmar 2014 after the competition. Additionally, he was awarded as Myanmar's Choice awards.

Mister International 2014
He represented Myanmar at the Mister International 2014 pageant which took place in Seoul, Korea on February 14, 2015, where he competed against 50 pageant hopefuls from around the world. After the competition, he placed in the top 15.

References

Mister International
1994 births
Burmese male models
Living people